The File on H. is a novel by the Albanian author Ismail Kadare. It first appeared in Albanian in 1981 under the title Dosja H.

Plot
In this often-comic novel, two Homeric scholars from Ireland by way of Harvard University plan to investigate the tradition of oral epic poetry in the rural habitats of Albania where historical epics are composed and sung by itinerant minstrels as popular entertainment. The singers have been doing this for many generations, possibly since ancient Greek times (H stands for Homer). The scholars travel to Albania with a tape recorder to study the phenomenon and record samples of the singing and the changes over time in multiple recordings of the same song, the study of which would give them an answer whether Homer was an editor or a writer. Their main interest is in the variations on the tradition exemplified in the work of individual singers, how historical events are woven into poetry, and whether there is regional bias in their interpretations.

When they reach their destination, they are confronted by suspicious provincial townspeople and a paranoid local governor, who sends spies after them, convinced that they themselves are spies of some sort. Their work is attacked by the Serbian pastor because the scholars favor the Albanian epic poetry as original and the Serbian as an imitation. One interpretation of the story is a metaphor for why legends continue to be believed despite our attempts to discover the truth, and highlights the difficulty that the modern world has in truly understanding past, or even rural, civilizations. The novel also considers the passing of the epic form as a means of recording and retelling history and questions the nature of civilization itself as art forms are lost to development and technology.

Translations

The French translation of 1989 (revised in 1996) was by Jusuf Vrioni. It appears in volume 4 of Ismail Kadare's collected works (Ismail Kadare: Oeuvres). The English version by David Bellos, published in 1997, was made on the basis of the French translation.

Reception of the English edition

The English translation garnered mostly positive reviews. Reviewers praised the novel, calling it "one of his most unusual and attractive books," and Kadare "a voice unlike any other in contemporary fiction". Jennie Ver Steeg, from Booklist, called it a "a witty, multilayered critique of totalitarianism, nationalism, and scholarly objectivity". Publishers Weekly referred to it as "an amusing parable," and to Kadare as a "Controversial Albanian dissident". They called the relationship between the governor and Dull Baxhaja "a masterpiece of Gogolian comedy". On the other hand, Ken Kalfus criticized the novel, calling it "lazily plotted, stylelessly written" and a "nationalist whine". He went on to accuse Kadare of conforming to Hoxha's "communist-nationalist doctrine."

References

1981 novels
20th-century Albanian novels
Novels by Ismail Kadare
Novels set in Albania